4,4′-Diisothiocyano-2,2′-stilbenedisulfonic acid (DIDS) is an anion exchange inhibitor, blocking reversibly, and later irreversibly, exchangers such as chloride-bicarbonate exchanger.

References

Sulfonic acids
Isothiocyanates
Alkene derivatives